Francisco José "Curro" Sánchez Rodríguez (born 3 January 1996) is a Spanish footballer who plays as an attacking midfielder for Burgos CF.

Club career
Born in La Palma del Condado, Huelva, Andalusia, Curro joined Sevilla FC's youth setup in 2007, aged 11. He made his debuts as a senior in the 2012–13 campaign, in Segunda División B.

On 5 February 2015, Curro renewed his contract, signing a deal until 2017. He made his first team debut on 2 December, starting in a 3–0 away win against UD Logroñés, for the season's Copa del Rey.

Curro made his La Liga debut on 17 April 2016, coming on as a second-half substitute for José Antonio Reyes in a 1–1 home draw against Deportivo de La Coruña. He scored his first goal as a professional on 21 August, netting the first in the B-team's 3–3 Segunda División home draw against Girona FC.

On 16 July 2019, Curro moved to second division side CD Numancia on a two-year deal. He scored a career-best 13 goals for the club during the campaign, but was unable to avoid team relegation.

On 9 September 2020, Curro signed a one-year contract with SD Ponferradina, still in the second division. The following 10 July, he agreed to a three-year deal with fellow league team UD Almería.

Curro featured regularly for the Rojiblancos during the season, as his side achieved promotion to the top tier as champions. On 1 September 2022, however, he terminated his contract, and signed a two-year deal with Burgos CF in the second division two days later.

Career statistics

Club

References

External links
 
 

1996 births
Living people
Sportspeople from the Province of Huelva
Spanish footballers
Footballers from Andalusia
Association football midfielders
La Liga players
Segunda División players
Segunda División B players
Sevilla Atlético players
Sevilla FC players
CD Numancia players
SD Ponferradina players
UD Almería players
Burgos CF footballers
Spain youth international footballers